This is a list of aircraft operators which are licensed by the Kyrgyz civil aviation authorities and which have been assigned domestic codes by the Kyrgyzstan authorities.

Scheduled airlines

Cargo airlines

See also
 List of defunct airlines of Kyrgyzstan
 List of airports in Kyrgyzstan
 List of air carriers banned in the European Union
 List of defunct airlines of Asia
 List of airlines

References

Kyrgyzstan
Airlines
Airlines
Kyrgyzstan